Gaetano Mignani (31 August 1882 – 29 January 1973) was an Italian prelate of the Catholic Church. He served as Apostolic vicar of Kianfu (Ji'an Prefecture), he became the first Catholic Bishop of the Roman Catholic Diocese of Ji'an when the region was elevated to a diocese in 1946, a position he would hold until 1951, when the new Communist government expelled him from the country.

Biography
Born 31 August 1882 in Piumazza di Castelfranco Emilia, Bologna, Italy, Mignani was a member of the Congregation of the Mission, commonly known as the Vincentians, professing at 21 years of age in 1904. Ordained to the priesthood on 19 March  1905, Mignani served as a missionary in China. At the age of 45, he was appointed Apostolic Vicar of Kianfu, receiving his episcopal consecration with the titular see of Cassandria on 17 February 1929.

Succeeding to the Vicariate of Kianfu on 15 October 1931 following the retirement of Monsignor Nicola Cicero CM. When Kianfu [Ji'an], was elevated to a diocese on 11 April 1946 by Pope Pius XII, Mignani became its first bishop.

On 14 June 1951, Chinese police escorted him to the Hong Kong frontier and he was expelled from China.

He participated in all four sessions of the Second Vatican Council.

Mignani retained his office until his death in Rome on 29 January  1973, at 90 years of age. 

Bishop Mignani requested to be buried in his Cathedral of Ji'an in his will, but due to political unrest in China, his remains still lie at the Verano Cemetery of Rome.

References

External links

1882 births
1973 deaths
Clergy from Bologna
Roman Catholic missionaries in China
Italian Roman Catholic missionaries
Italian expatriates in China
Burials at Campo Verano
20th-century Roman Catholic bishops in China